Quennec is a surname. Notable people with the surname include: 

Hugh Quennec (born 1965), Swiss sports team owner
Kaleigh Quennec (born 1998), Canadian-Swiss ice hockey player